The 1989–90 Segunda División season saw 20 teams participate in the second flight Spanish league. Real Burgos, Real Betis and RCD Español were promoted to Primera División. Racing de Santander, Castilla CF, Recreativo de Huelva and Atlético Madrileño were relegated to Segunda División B.

Teams

Final table

Results

Promotion playoff

First Leg

Second Leg

Pichichi Trophy for Top Goalscorers 
Last updated June 21, 2009

Segunda División seasons
2
Spain